Qeshlan-e Khoda Karam (also Romanized as Qeshlāq-e Khodā Karam; also known as Qeshlāq-e Khākaram and Qishlāq Khakaram) is a village in Yeylan-e Shomali Rural District, in the Central District of Dehgolan County, Kurdistan Province, Iran. At the 2006 census, its population was 69, in 17 families. The village is populated by Kurds.

References 

Towns and villages in Dehgolan County
Kurdish settlements in Kurdistan Province